Ernestine Christine Reiske (2 April 1735 – 27 July 1798) was a German translator of classical texts. She was a scholar of Greek literature, and oriental languages and literature.

Biography
Ernestine Christine Reiske was born as Ernestine Christine Müller on 2 April 1735 at Kemberg in Wittenberg district, Saxony-Anhalt, Germany. She didn’t receive any formal education. As her family couldn’t afford the education of all the children, the sons were given the opportunity to learn. But her elder brother acted as her teacher.

In 1764 she married Johann Jakob Reiske (1716 – 1774), the distinguished classicist and orientalist, who was the professor of Arabic studies at Leipzig University. He gave her Greek lessons. She became a competent classical scholar in her own right.

After her husband's death, she completed several of his works. In 1783 she published his autobiography the Lebensbeschreibung. She also published two volumes of her own, which mainly contained the works by Libanius, Xenophon, Epictetus, and others. These include Hellas (1778)  and Zur Moral (1782).

She was 63 years old when she died in Kemberg, Wittenberg on 27 July 1798.

References

1735 births
1798 deaths
Scholars of Greek language
German scholars
German orientalists